Rockabilly Baby is a 1957 American musical film directed by William F. Claxton and written by William Driskill and William George. The film stars Virginia Field, Douglas Kennedy, Les Brown, Irene Ryan, Ellen Corby, Marlene Willis and Judy Busch.

The film was produced by Robert L. Lippert's Regal Films, and released on October 30, 1957, by 20th Century Fox.

Plot

Cast

Production
The film was announced under the working title Mother Was a Stripper. Filming took place in June 1957.

Release
The film had its world premiere on September 15, 1957, in Ukiah, California. This was because star Judy Busch was the daughter of Senator Busch from Ukiah.

References

External links
 
 
 
 

1957 films
1957 musical films
1950s English-language films
20th Century Fox films
CinemaScope films
American musical films
Films directed by William F. Claxton
Films set in New England
1950s American films